Alex Blias is an Australian actor, who has appeared in television, film and theatre roles. His film career began in Australia. He was selected for a supporting role in the 1998 film "Spank!". Later, he would go on to play roles in television, and theatre. In 2005 and 2006 he also performed at the Melbourne International Comedy Festival and Cracker Comedy Festival.

Television credits
 Home and Away as Chris Poulos, brother of Leah Poulos
 Always Greener as ‘Skid’ Mark Pannas
 All Saints as Jack

Film credits
 Spank! (1999)
 Get Rich Quick (2004)

Theatre credits
 It’s a Mother
 It’s a Father

References

External links

Australian people of Greek descent
Australian male television actors
Living people
Year of birth missing (living people)